Józef Franciszek Kurek (2 January 1933 — 18 February 2015) was a Polish ice hockey player. He played for KTH Krynica, OWKS Bydgoszcz, and Legia Warsaw during his career. He also played for the Polish national team at several world championships as well as the 1956 and 1964 Winter Olympics. He won the Polish hockey league championship eight times in his career, once with Krynica in 1950 and seven times with Legia. After his playing career Kurek turned to coaching, and served as the coach of the Polish national team in the 1970s, most notably during the 1976 World Championship when Poland upset the Soviet Union 6–4, considered one of the greatest upsets in hockey history. He was awarded the Silver Cross of Merit for his services.

References

External links

1933 births
2015 deaths
Ice hockey players at the 1956 Winter Olympics
Ice hockey players at the 1964 Winter Olympics
KTH Krynica players
Legia Warsaw (ice hockey) players
Olympic ice hockey players of Poland
People from Krynica-Zdrój
Poland men's national ice hockey team coaches
Polish ice hockey coaches
Polish ice hockey forwards
Recipients of the Silver Cross of Merit (Poland)
Sportspeople from Lesser Poland Voivodeship